The 2018–19 El Dakhleya season was the 14th season in the football club's history and 6th consecutive and overall season in the top flight of Egyptian football, the Egyptian Premier League, having been promoted from the Egyptian Second Division in 2011. In addition to the domestic league, El Dakhleya also competed in this season's edition of the domestic cup, the Egypt Cup. The season covered a period from 1 July 2018 to 30 June 2019.

Kit information
Supplier: Kone

Players

Current squad

Transfers

Transfers in

Loans in

Transfers out

Friendly matches

Competitions

Overview

Egyptian Premier League

League table

Results summary

Results by round

Matches

Egypt Cup

Statistics

Appearances and goals

! colspan="9" style="background:#DCDCDC; text-align:center" | Players transferred out during the season
|-

|}

Goalscorers

Clean sheets

References

Notes

Dakhleya